Leighton Price (born 24 March 1989) is a New Zealand rugby union player. He plays for Taranaki in the ITM Cup.  Previously he played for Hawke's Bay and Bay of Plenty. He plays Lock.

Māori All Blacks
In October 2016 Price, who affiliates to the Ngāti Maniapoto iwi, was named in the Māori All Blacks team for their end-of-year tour to the Northern Hemisphere.

References

1989 births
Living people
New Zealand rugby union players
Rugby union players from Hamilton, New Zealand
Hawke's Bay rugby union players
Taranaki rugby union players
Bay of Plenty rugby union players
Rugby union locks
People educated at New Plymouth Boys' High School
Māori All Blacks players
Ngāti Maniapoto people